The 1988–89 season was the 109th season of competitive football by Rangers.

Overview
Rangers played a total of 53 competitive matches during the 1988–89 season. They regained the Scottish Premier Division title, winning the first of nine consecutive league titles.

England international right back, Gary Stevens was signed from Everton and Kevin Drinkell was brought in to partner Ally McCoist up front.

Results against Celtic were pivotal in the Championship race, winning 5–1 and 4–1 at Ibrox. They also secured their first win at Parkhead since 1980, 2–1 in March. The league was won at Ibrox with a 4–0 demolition of Hearts.

In the cup competitions, they lost the Scottish Cup final 1–0 to Celtic. The team won the Scottish League Cup (Skol Cup) for the third season in a row defeating Aberdeen 3–2.

The European campaign was disappointing. The team qualified for the UEFA Cup and after a fine aggregate win over Polish side GKS Katowice, they were knocked out in the second round by Cologne of West Germany.

Lawrence Marlborough sold his controlling interest in Rangers to David Murray in November. Murray later took over as Chairman from David Holmes.

Transfer

In

Out

Results

Scottish Premier Division

UEFA Cup

Scottish Cup

League Cup

Appearances

League table

See also
 1988–89 in Scottish football
 1988–89 Scottish Cup
 1988–89 Scottish League Cup
 1988–89 UEFA Cup
Nine in a row

References 

Rangers F.C. seasons
Rangers
Scottish football championship-winning seasons